Vernaya is a genus of rodent in the subfamily Murinae from southern China and northern Burma. It contains a single extant species, the red climbing mouse (Vernaya fulva), and several extinct species, all described by Zheng in 1993, namely Vernaya prefulva, Vernaya pristina, Vernaya giganta and Vernaya wushanica. The genus is named after Arthur Stannard Vernay who collected the specimen of V. fulva on an expedition to Burma with Charles Suydam Cutting.

References

 
Rodent genera
Taxa named by Glover Morrill Allen